Suraj Yadav (born 26 October 1987) is an Indian first-class cricketer who plays for Services.

References

External links
 

1987 births
Living people
Indian cricketers
Services cricketers
People from New Delhi